Foreign relations exist between Australia and Sri Lanka. Australia has a High Commission in Colombo, likewise, Sri Lanka has a High Commission in Canberra.

Both Australia and Sri Lanka are members of the Commonwealth of Nations.

History

Pre-19th century
Relations between both nations of Australia and Sri Lanka may have existed before colonialism. The Tamil Bell, discovered in 1836 by missionary William Colenso in New Zealand led to a speculation about a possible Tamil presence in New Zealand and possibly Australia  as said by Indologist V. R. Ramachandra Dikshitar in his book called The Origin and Spread of the Tamils which states that the Tamil seafarers might have a knowledge of Australia and Polynesia. It is believed that the Tamils could have reached Australia in the 14th century coming from the areas of present-day India and Sri Lanka.

19th and early 20th centuries
Both Australia and Sri Lanka were colonies of the British Empire. During the 19th and early 20th centuries, many people from Ceylon migrated to Australia which was mainly for labour purposes.

1948–present
After gaining independence from the United Kingdom, Ceylon opened a High Commission in Canberra in 1949. In 1951 Ceylon's Prime Minister D.S. Senanayake was the first high-profile diplomatic visitor to Australia, which was followed by Prime Minister Sir John Kotelawala in 1954. President Junius Richard Jayewardene visited Australia in 1978. In 2011 President Mahinda Rajapaksa participated in the CHOGM summit in Perth, Australia. In 2017 Prime Minister Ranil Wickremesinghe and President Maithripala Sirisena made state visits to Australia. Prime Ministers Sir Robert Menzies, Gough Whitlam and Tony Abbott have visited Sri Lanka. In November 2017 PM Malcolm Turnbull visited to Sri Lanka.

The Australian Government has expressed concern over the conflict between the Sri Lankan Government and the Tamil Tigers. In October 2008, Australian Foreign Minister Stephen Smith told his Sri Lankan counterpart that military action alone will not solve the dispute with the Tamil separatists. In May 2009, Australian Foreign Minister Stephen Smith said that Sri Lanka should seek a political solution with the Tamils to stop another generation turning to terrorism.

During Prime Minister Tony Abbott's visit to Sri Lanka for the Commonwealth Heads of Government Meeting 2013 meeting, he announced Australia would be donating two navy patrol boats to the Sri Lankan Navy to promote enhanced collaboration on people smuggling.

2017 marked the 70 Years of relationships between Australia and Sri Lanka, Prime Minister Ranil Wickramasinghe paid a state visit to Australia to mark the event.

Trade
In 2007 a two-way trade agreement was created between Australia and Sri Lanka valued at $232 million a year. The trade agreement includes exports from Australia such as vegetables and dairy products. Tea and other foods, textiles, clothing, rubber, iron and steel which are the main imports from Sri Lanka.

Aid
In 2008-09 the estimated budget for aid to Sri Lanka is $27 million.  In April 2009, the Australian Government announced a further A$4.5 million of humanitarian aid to assist the end of the civil war in Sri Lanka. $1.5 million will be given to United Nations High Commissioner for Refugees and the International Organisation for Migration.

See also
 Sri Lankan Australian
 Foreign relations of Australia
 Foreign relations of Sri Lanka
 List of Australian High Commissioners to Sri Lanka

References

External links
 Sri Lanka Country Brief

 
Australia and the Commonwealth of Nations
Sri Lanka and the Commonwealth of Nations
Bilateral relations of Sri Lanka
Sri Lanka